Louis Versyp, or Versijp, (5 December 1908 – 27 June 1988) was a Belgian football player and manager. He earned 34 caps and scored 8 goals for the Belgium national football team. He was part of Belgium's team for the 1928 Summer Olympics.

Clubs

Player
1926–1937 Club Brugge

Manager
1945–1950 Club Brugge
1950–1951 Melda Maldegem
1951–1952 AS Oostende KM
1952–1953 Cercle Brugge
1956–1957 Cercle Brugge
1958–1963 AS Oostende

References

External links

Biography at Club Brugge

1908 births
1930 FIFA World Cup players
1988 deaths
Belgian footballers
Belgian football managers
Belgium international footballers
Olympic footballers of Belgium
Footballers at the 1928 Summer Olympics
1934 FIFA World Cup players
Club Brugge KV players
Club Brugge KV head coaches
Cercle Brugge K.S.V. managers
Footballers from Bruges
Association football forwards